Anime Festival Orlando (AFO) is an annual three-day anime convention held during summer at the Wyndham Orlando Resort International Drive in Orlando, Florida.

Programming
The convention typically offers an Artist Alley, cosplay contents, maid cafe, panels, rave, vendors, and a video game room. An interactive game "Orlandia" occurs during the convention. The convention's charity event in 2009 benefited Child's Play.

History
The conventions organization began in December 1999. AFO shared space with another convention hosting Governor Jeb Bush in 2006. Anime Festival Orlando 2020 was moved from June to November due to the COVID-19 pandemic, but was later cancelled. Anime Festival Orlando was also cancelled in 2021 due to the COVID-19 pandemic.

Event history

Gallery

References

External links
 Anime Festival Orlando Website

Anime conventions in the United States
Festivals established in 2000
2000 establishments in Florida
Annual events in Florida
Festivals in Orlando, Florida
Tourist attractions in Greater Orlando
Tourist attractions in Orange County, Florida
Tourist attractions in Orlando, Florida
Conventions in Florida